Floyd Bixler McKissick Jr. (born November 21, 1952) is an American attorney who served as a Democratic member of the North Carolina Senate. He was appointed to the Senate by Governor Mike Easley on April 18, 2007 to replace the late Jeanne Hopkins Lucas and was later elected and re-elected in his own right. In 2011, he became Deputy Minority Leader in the Senate and chairman of the North Carolina Legislative Black Caucus. He resigned in 2020 after having been appointed by Gov. Roy Cooper to the state Utilities Commission.

McKissick is the son of the late civil rights activist Floyd McKissick.

Education and career
McKissick works in civil litigation. He practices business law, criminal defense, family law, and administrative law.

McKissick received an A.B. Degree in Geography, from Clark University in Worcester, Massachusetts. He received a master's degree in Regional Planning from UNC-Chapel Hill, and a master's degree in Public Administration, from Harvard University. McKissick received a Juris Doctor Degree from the Duke University School of Law in Durham, North Carolina. McKissick has practiced law since 1983 with a number of law firms, including Dickstein Shapiro in Washington, D.C., and Faison, Brown & Brough in Durham, N.C. McKissick has practiced with McKissick & McKissick since 1990.

For a time McKissick owned a convenience store in Warren County, North Carolina. On December 27, 1985 two armed men robbed the store. After taking cash from the register, they shot McKissick in the left arm with a shotgun, nearly detaching it from his body. The two men were later arrested and incarcerated. McKissick's arm healed, though it lost some of its mobility.

He co-authored a guide book for the International Trade Administration in the U.S. Department of Commerce on Attracting Foreign Direct Investment to the United States (1981).

He authored an article for the Construction Law Advisor on When An Owner Can Terminate a Construction Contract Due to Delay (1984).

McKissick was disciplined by the N.C. State Bar for professional misconduct involving a conflict of interest. The bar found that McKissick improperly represented both sides in a 2000 dispute involving the estate decisions of an elderly Durham man.

In 1995, McKissick's former wife said he physically abused her, and in 2001 a former employee of his law firm said he hit her with a telephone. He was acquitted in both cases.

In 1999, McKissick unsuccessfully ran for mayor of Durham.

Appointment to Senate
At the time of his selection by the Durham Democratic Party to fill the vacancy (due to the death of Jeanne Lucas from breast cancer) in District 20 in the state senate, McKissick was the chairman of the Durham County Democratic Party, which raised questions of a conflict of interest in the selection process.

References

External links
NC Senate website
Project Vote Smart - Senator Floyd McKissick, Jr. (NC) profile
Follow the Money - Floyd McKissick Jr.
2008 campaign contributions
 Mckissick & Mckissick law practice website
 

Democratic Party North Carolina state senators
Living people
North Carolina lawyers
Clark University alumni
University of North Carolina at Chapel Hill alumni
Harvard Kennedy School alumni
Duke University School of Law alumni
1952 births
African-American state legislators in North Carolina
21st-century American politicians
21st-century African-American politicians
20th-century African-American people